Baba Qoli (also Romanized as Bābā Qolī) is a village in Kuhdasht-e Jonubi Rural District, in the Central District of Kuhdasht County, Lorestan Province, Iran. At the 2006 census, its population was 422, in 83 families.

References

External Links 

 https://www.tageo.com/index-e-ir-v-23-d-m5031938.htm

Towns and villages in Kuhdasht County